Turris brevicanalis is a species of sea snail, a marine gastropod mollusk in the family Turridae, the turrids.

Description
The length of the shell varies between 51 mm and 70.4 mm.

Distribution
This marine species occurs in the East China Sea and off Japan.

References

 Kuroda, T.; Habe, T.; Oyama, K. (1971). The sea shells of Sagami Bay. Maruzen Co., Tokyo. pp. i–xix, 1–741 (Japanese), 121 pls., 1–489 (English), 1–51 (index). 
 Kilburn R.N., Fedosov A.E. & Olivera B.M. (2012) Revision of the genus Turris Batsch, 1789 (Gastropoda: Conoidea: Turridae) with the description of six new species. Zootaxa 3244: 1-58.

brevicanalis
Gastropods described in 1971